Dylan DeMelo (born May 1, 1993) is a Canadian professional ice hockey defenceman currently playing with the Winnipeg Jets of the National Hockey League (NHL). DeMelo was selected by the San Jose Sharks in the 6th round (179th overall) of the 2011 NHL Entry Draft.

Playing career

Junior
DeMelo played four seasons (2009–13) of major junior hockey in the Ontario Hockey League (OHL) with the Mississauga St. Michael's Majors and Mississauga Steelheads, recording 25 goals and 125 points in 218 games.

DeMelo was Mississauga's nominee for both the Ivan Tennant Memorial Award and Bobby Smith Trophy for the 2010–11 season. Both trophies recognize academic excellence.

Professional

San Jose Sharks
DeMelo was selected 179th overall in the 2011 NHL Entry Draft by the San Jose Sharks and he signed an entry-level contract with the organization on April 20, 2012. He made his NHL debut with San Jose on October 17, 2015, in a game against the New York Islanders. DeMelo scored his first NHL goal against goaltender Roman Will on January 26, 2016, in a 6–1 San Jose victory over the Colorado Avalanche.

After completing his second full season with San Jose in 2017–18, DeMelo was an impending restricted free agent and was initially not tendered a qualifying offer by the Sharks. Despite the limited opportunity to explore free agency, DeMelo ultimately re-signed with the Sharks for two more years on July 7, 2018.

Ottawa Senators
DeMelo was involved in a blockbuster trade on September 13, 2018, as he was dealt by San Jose to the Ottawa Senators as part of a package including Rudolfs Balcers, Chris Tierney, Josh Norris, a conditional 2019 second-round draft pick and a conditional 2020 first-round draft pick, in exchange for Ottawa's captain and two-time Norris Trophy winner Erik Karlsson.

In his first season in Ottawa, DeMelo recorded 22 points in 77 games and was paired with the franchise's top defensive prospect Thomas Chabot. "I've been very pleased", he said of his debut season with the Senators, noting that the Ottawa coaching staff trusted him to play a top-four role, an opportunity he had never received in San Jose.

Winnipeg Jets
On February 18, 2020, DeMelo was traded by the Senators to the Winnipeg Jets in exchange for a 2020 third-round pick. At the time of the trade, he had recorded 10 points in 49 games. He appeared in 10 regular season games with the Jets before the season was paused due to the COVID-19 pandemic. Returning for the post-season, DeMelo led the club in short-handed ice time through 4 games in a qualifying series defeat to the Flames.

On October 7, 2020, DeMelo opted to forgo free agency and was signed to a four-year, $12 million contract with the Jets. Following the signing of his contract, DeMelo said his "first choice was Winnipeg" and he had unfinished business in the city.

Personal life
DeMelo is a Portuguese Canadian. In January 2021, DeMelo and his wife Jessica had their first child together.

Career statistics

References

External links

1993 births
Living people
Canadian expatriate ice hockey players in the United States
Canadian ice hockey defencemen
Ice hockey people from Ontario
Mississauga St. Michael's Majors players
Mississauga Steelheads players
Ontario Junior Hockey League players
Ottawa Senators players
San Jose Barracuda players
San Jose Sharks draft picks
San Jose Sharks players
Sportspeople from London, Ontario
Winnipeg Jets players
Worcester Sharks players
Canadian people of Portuguese descent